The Revolutionary Communist Movement of Greece or EKKE (Greek: Επαναστατικό Κομμουνιστικό Κίνημα Ελλάδας, ΕΚΚΕ) is a communist political party in Greece.

Alliances
In 1999, EKKE joined the Radical Left Front (MERA) political coalition and in 2009 Anticapitalist Left Cooperation for the Overthrow.

See also
Anticapitalist Left Cooperation for the Overthrow
Radical Left Front

External links
EKKE web site

Communist parties in Greece
Far-left politics in Greece